The following is a list of schools offering courses in Guam.

Guam Department of Education schools

Elementary schools
 Adacao Elementary (Mangilao)
 Agana Heights Elementary (Agana Heights)
 Astumbo Elementary (Dededo)
 C.L. Taitano Elementary (Sinajana)
 Carbullido Elementary (Barrigada)
 Chief Brodie Elementary (Tumon)
 Daniel L. Perez Elementary (Yigo)
 F.Q. Sanchez Elementary
 Finegayan Elementary (Dededo)
 Harry S. Truman Elementary (Santa Rita)
 Inarajan Elementary (Inarajan)
 J.Q. San Miguel Elementary (Toto)
 Juan M. Guerrero Elementary 
 Liguan Elementary School (Dededo)
 Lyndon B. Johnson Elementary
 M.U. Lujan Elementary
 Machananao Elementary (Yigo)
 Marcial Sablan Elementary (Agat)
 Maria A. Ulloa Elementary (Dededo)
 Merizo Elementary (Merizo)
 Ordot/Chalan Pago Elementary (Chalan Pago)
 P.C. Lujan Elementary (Barrigada)
 Price Elementary (Mangilao)
 Talofofo Elementary (Talofofo)
 Tamuning Elementary (Tamuning)
 Upi Elementary (Yigo) 
 Wettengel Elementary (Dededo)

Middle schools
 Agueda Johnston Middle School (Ordot)
 Astumbo Middle School (Dededo)
 F.B. Leon Guerrero Middle School (Yigo)
 Inarajan Middle School (Inarajan)
 Jose Rios Middle School (Piti)
 Luis P. Untalan Middle School (Barrigada)
 Oceanview Middle School (Agat)
 Vicente San Agustin Benavente Middle School (Dededo)

High schools
 George Washington High School (Mangilao)
 John F. Kennedy High School (Tamuning)
 Okkodo High School (Dededo)
 Simon Sanchez High School (Yigo)
 Southern High School (Santa Rita)
 Tiyan High School (Barrigada)

Department of Defense Education Activity
 Andersen Elementary School
 Andersen Middle School
 Commander William C. McCool Elementary/Middle School (originally Guam South Elementary/Middle School; located in the Apra Heights area of Santa Rita)
 Guam High School

Private schools
 Asumyao Community School (9-12)
 Montessori School of Guam

Catholic schools
 Academy of Our Lady of Guam (Hagatna)
 Bishop Baumgartner Memorial Catholic School (Sinajana)
 Dominican Catholic School (Yigo)
 Dominican Child Care (Ordot)
 Father Duenas Memorial School (Mangilao)
 Infant of Prague Catholic Nursery & Kindergarten (Mangilao)
 Maria Artero
 Mercy Heights
 Notre Dame High School (Talofofo)
 Our Lady of Mount Carmel Catholic School (Agat)
 Saint Anthony Catholic School (Tamuning)
 Saint Francis Catholic School (Yona)
 St. Thomas Aquinas Catholic High School
 San Vicente Catholic School (Barrigada)
 Santa Barbara Catholic School (Dededo)

Protestant schools
 Blessed Seed Christian Academy
 Evangelical Christian Academy
 Family Baptist Church-School (K-12)
 Grace Academy Guam  (PK-12)
 Guam Adventist Academy (K-12) 
 Guam International Christian Academy
 Harvest Christian Academy (PK-12)
 Pacific Christian Academy, Dededo (K4-12)
 Providence International Christian Academy (K-12)
 St. John's School (PK-12)
 St. Paul Christian School
 Southern Christian Academy (PK2-12)
 Temple Christian School, Chalan Pago (K-12)
 Trinity Christian School (K-12)

Chamorro language schools
 Chief Gadao Academy of Arts, Science and Chamorro Culture (PK-12)
 Sagan Fina' na' guen Fino' Chamorro

Japanese school
 Japanese School of Guam (Guam Nihonjin gakko and Hoshuko)

Charter schools
 Guahan Academy Charter School
 iLearn Academy Charter School
 SIFA Learning Academy Charter School
 Career Tech High Academy Charter School

Colleges and universities
 Guam Community College
 Pacific Islands University
 University of Guam

See also
List of schools in United States territories

References
 Guam Public School System

 
Schools
Guam
Lists of organizations based in Guam
Cook